Francisco Ruiz (1476 – 23 October 1528) was a Roman Catholic prelate who served as Bishop of Ávila (1514–1528) and Bishop of Ciudad Rodrigo (1510–1514).

He was born in Toledo, Spain and ordained a priest in the Order of Friars Minor. On 18 November 1509 he was selected by the King of Spain and confirmed by Pope Julius II as Bishop of Ciudad Rodrigo. On 14 July 1514 he was appointed by the King of Spain and confirmed by Pope Leo X as Bishop of Ávila. He served as Bishop of Ávila until his death, on 23 October 1528.

References

External links and additional sources
 (for Chronology of Bishops) 
 (for Chronology of Bishops) 
 (for Chronology of Bishops) 
 (for Chronology of Bishops) 

1476 births
1528 deaths
16th-century Roman Catholic bishops in Spain
Bishops appointed by Pope Julius II
Bishops appointed by Pope Leo X
Franciscan bishops